Aleksey Naumov may refer to:
 Aleksey Naumov (footballer)
 Aleksey Naumov (officer)